Vasculin is a protein that in humans is encoded by the GPBP1 gene.

References

Further reading